Dylan Sicobo (born 27 February 1997) is a Seychellois sprinter. He represented his country at the 2017 World Championships and 2018 World Indoor Championships without advancing from the first round. He also won the gold medal in the 100 metres at the 2017 Jeux de la Francophonie. He was the Seychelles sportsman of the year in 2017.

International competitions

1Did not start in the final

Personal bests
Outdoor
100 metres – 10.33 (+0.9 m/s, Abidjan 2017) NR
200 metres – 21.77 (NWI, Réduit 2016)
Indoor
60 metres – 6.82 (Birmingham 2018) NR

References

1997 births
Living people
Seychellois male sprinters
World Athletics Championships athletes for Seychelles
Athletes (track and field) at the 2018 Commonwealth Games
People from Greater Victoria, Seychelles
Athletes (track and field) at the 2019 African Games
Commonwealth Games competitors for Seychelles
African Games competitors for Seychelles
Athletes (track and field) at the 2022 Commonwealth Games